Hoskins Sotutu (born 12 July 1998) is a New Zealand rugby union player who plays for the  in Super Rugby. His playing position is flanker.

His excellent form for the Blues in Super Rugby Aotearoa resulted in a call-up to the All Blacks squad in 2020. Sotutu made his debut for the All Blacks off the bench against Australia in the 1st Bledisloe Cup test on 11 October 2020.

Reference list

External links
itsrugby.co.uk profile
 

1998 births
New Zealand rugby union players
Living people
Rugby union flankers
Auckland rugby union players
Blues (Super Rugby) players
New Zealand people of Fijian descent
People educated at Sacred Heart College, Auckland
Rugby union number eights
Counties Manukau rugby union players
New Zealand international rugby union players
Rugby union players from Auckland